Postia ptychogaster, commonly known as the powderpuff bracket, is a species of fungus in the family Fomitopsidaceae. The fungus, which is found in Europe, resembles a powdery cushion that fruits on stumps and logs of rotting conifer wood. In this stage of its life cycle, the "cushion" is a mass of chlamydospores.

References

Fungi described in 1880
Fungi of Europe
Fomitopsidaceae